The Walter Reed Gardens Historic District, also known as Commons of Arlington, is a national historic district located in Arlington County, Virginia. It contains 18 contributing buildings in a residential neighborhood in South Arlington. The two- and three-story, brick garden apartment complex was built in 1948, in the Colonial Revival style. It was converted to condominiums in 1982–1984, and has 134 units, include 56 one bedroom units and 78 two-bedroom units in four clusters of buildings.

It was listed on the National Register of Historic Places in 2003.

References

Residential buildings on the National Register of Historic Places in Virginia
Colonial Revival architecture in Virginia
Historic districts in Arlington County, Virginia
National Register of Historic Places in Arlington County, Virginia
Historic districts on the National Register of Historic Places in Virginia